The National Day of Commemorating the Holocaust (Ziua Naţională de Comemorare a Holocaustului in Romanian) is a national event held on October 9 in Romania. It is dedicated to the remembrance of the victims of the Holocaust and particularly to reflecting on Romania's role in the Holocaust. Various commemoration events and ceremonies take place throughout Romania in order to remember the Jews and Romani who died in the Holocaust.

The first National Day of Commemorating the Holocaust was held in 2004. October 9 was chosen as a date for this event because it marks the beginning of Romanian deportations of Jews to Transnistria, in 1941.

On October 9, 2005, the Romanian Minister for Foreign Affairs, Mihai Răzvan Ungureanu, participated in the laying of a wreath at the Holocaust Memorial in Iaşi. The Centre for Hebrew Studies, part of the Alexandru Ioan Cuza University, was also inaugurated on the same day by Ungureanu. During the inaugural National Day of Commemorating the Holocaust, the Elie Wiesel National Institute for Studying the Holocaust in Romania was also opened.

On October 9, 2006, a ceremony took place for setting the keystone of the National Holocaust Memorial in Bucharest. The ceremony was attended by President Traian Băsescu, Foreign Minister Affairs Minister Mihai Răzvan Ungureanu, Culture Minister Adrian Iorgulescu, as well as representatives of the Romanian and international Jewish community. A commemoration march also took place through Bucharest in order to remember the Romani victims of the Holocaust and to demand greater recognition by the government of Romani Holocaust victims.

See also

History of the Jews in Romania
Elie Wiesel National Institute for Studying the Holocaust in Romania
Wiesel Commission
International Holocaust Remembrance Day
Yom HaShoah

References

Holocaust commemoration
The Holocaust in Romania
October observances
Annual events in Romania
2004 establishments in Romania
Recurring events established in 2004
Autumn events in Romania